
Gmina Włodawa is a rural gmina (administrative district) in Włodawa County, Lublin Voivodeship, in eastern Poland, on the border with Belarus and Ukraine. Its seat is the town of Włodawa, although the town is not part of the territory of the gmina.

Villages
Gmina Włodawa contains the villages and settlements of Korolówka, Korolówka-Kolonia, Korolówka-Osada, Krasówka, Luta, Okuninka, Orchówek, Połód, Różanka, Sobibór, Stawki, Suszno, Szuminka, Wołczyny, Żłobek Duży, Żłobek Mały and Żuków.

Neighbouring gminas
Gmina Włodawa is bordered by the town of Włodawa and by the gminas of Hanna, Hańsk, Wola Uhruska and Wyryki. It also borders Belarus and Ukraine.

See also
Sobibor extermination camp

References
Polish official population figures 2006

Wlodawa
Włodawa County